William Green (born April 28, 1960) is an American former track and field athlete. He is a former United States record holder and finished fifth in the hammer throw in the 1984 Olympic Games in Los Angeles, California.

Personal life and family
Bill Green grew up in the Silicon Valley region of the San Francisco Bay Area, graduating from Fremont High School in Sunnyvale, California in 1978, and California State University, Long Beach in 1984 with a bachelor's degree in political science. He is married to Julie Green and had two children, William John Jr. ("Jack") and Victoria ("Tori"). Green's son Jack died tragically at 19 years old September 5, 2020 by suicide following a psychiatric breakdown brought on by the COVID-19 quarantine. At the time of his death Jack was a recruited water polo player at UC Irvine, following his father into a career in athletics. The family currently resides permanently in Huntington Beach, California and part-time in the Lake Tahoe community of Fallen Leaf Lake.

Green is the son of William Hipkiss, an attorney and actor in community theater who in the 1970s and 1980s performed in over 20 productions at the Frauenthal Center for the Performing Arts in Muskegon, Michigan and other parts of Western Michigan. His mother is Barbara Green, former mayor and city councilwoman in the historical Lake Tahoe town of Truckee, California, who also served one term as County Supervisor for Nevada County, California. Bill was adopted at age five by Barbara Green's second husband Kenneth Green, and raised in California since the age of three.

Athletic career
Green was asked by the Fremont High School (Sunnyvale, CA) coaching staff to try out for the sport of track and field, based upon observations made in a physical education weightlifting class. A discus thrower for two years in high school who failed to qualify for the California state meet, he was recruited by renowned throwing coach Art Venegas near the beginning of his career. Venegas would later develop 33 national champions in 28 years as assistant and head coach at UCLA, a record never approached by any other university. Encouragement to try the hammer throw as a college freshman resulted in an NCAA All American designation and an AAU National Junior Champion title in 1979 in just five months with the event, and a ranking of third in the United States at the senior level three years later in 1982.

He placed tenth at the 1980 United States Olympic Trials. Competing collegiately, he was in the top five hammer throwers at the NCAA Men's Outdoor Track and Field Championship from 1981 to 1983. He had his first podium finish at the USA Outdoor Track and Field Championships in 1982, but fell back to fourth in 1983. He won his first national title at the 1986 USA Outdoor Championships, and was runner-up in 1987.

Green competed at the height of hammer throw performance historically, a time when the event was dominated by the Eastern Bloc communist sports system. Technical advancements in the hammer throw pioneered by the Soviet Union in the late 1970s were increasing distances at a furious pace by the early 1980s and the complex biomechanics of these changes, which evolved the hammer throw from a strength event to a focus on speed, were not well understood in other parts of the world.  Based on experience competing against Russian prodigy Igor Nikulin at the USA vs USSR Junior National Team competitions in 1979, an athlete who go on to become one of history's all-time performers and an Olympic medalist in 1992, Green and Venegas believed they could adopt the new technical changes and reestablish the United States as a viable competitor internationally after more than 25 years with no Americans on the Olympic podium. In 1983 and 1984 he set three American Collegiate Records, three United States National Records, and, after winning the American Olympic trials, he placed fifth at the 1984 Olympic Games. He is one of only three Americans since 1952 to place in the top six in Olympic competition, and his performance in Los Angeles established a prelude to the country's first Olympic medal in 40 years with Lance Deal's second-place finish in the 1996 Atlanta Games.

Endorsements and media appearances
He appeared in television shows, commercials, print advertisements and did product endorsement for such companies as Eastman Kodak, The Hershey Company (Care Free gum), the Ford Motor Company, Mazda, Seafirst Bank, Mizuno Corp., and Nike, Inc. Green also worked as a consultant on the children's movie "Matilda", advising actress Pam Ferris, whose character in the story Miss Agatha Trunchbull had been an Olympic hammer thrower.

Retirement from athletics
Green became disillusioned with the lack of support and training resources necessary for an American athlete to challenge in an area of sports dominated by the Eastern Bloc athletic system at the height of its success in the 1980s. This factor, combined with the belief that drug use was required to medal at a second Olympic Games and a limited interest in the event in the United States, eroded his enthusiasm for Track and Field.

In August 1987, he became embroiled in a controversy generating international headlines when he was disqualified for doping at the Pan American Games in Indianapolis, Indiana, where he had won the silver medal. He had tested positive for testosterone with a T/E ratio of 11,2-1. In April 1988 IAAF handed him an eighteen-month ban from sports for the anti-doping rule violation.

After a ten-month appeal process, according to one of Green's lawyers, under threat of litigation for violating American due process rights the general secretary of International Association of Athletics Federations allowed him to compete in the 1988 United States Olympic Trials. Without sufficient time to prepare given the delays, he did not defend his title at the 1988 Olympic Trials or compete in the Olympic Games in Seoul, South Korea. Green retired from track and field in 1987 at age 27.

He was inducted into the Long Beach State Athletic Hall of Fame in October 2001.

Professional career
Beginning as a trainee at the Century City, California office of international insurance broker Johnson & Higgins, he became a sales and marketing executive with the SCPIE Companies (a division of Johnson and Higgins). He served as Vice President of Sales at SCPIE until 2006, and later held the same title at The Doctors Company in Napa, California. He has been Director of Marketing for the Medical Insurance Exchange of California (MIEC) in Oakland, California since 2010.

International competitions

|1983
|Universiade
|Edmonton, Canada
|4th
|Hammer throw
|-
|1984
|Olympic Games
|Los Angeles, United States
|5th
|Hammer throw
|-
|1987
|Pan American Games
|Indianapolis, United States
|2nd 
|Hammer throw
|}

National titles
USA Outdoor Track and Field Championships
Hammer throw: 1986
United States Olympic Trials
Hammer throw: 1984
USA Outdoor Junior Track and Field Championships
Hammer throw: 1979

Records

See also
 List of Olympic medalists in athletics (men)

References

External links

Olympic Games video clip
Montage of Olympic Games hammer throwers
Soviet Union documentary on the Hammer Throw-footage from the 1986 Goodwill Games

1960 births
Living people
People from Laurel, Maryland
Sportspeople from Sunnyvale, California
Track and field athletes from California
American male hammer throwers
Male weight throwers
Olympic track and field athletes of the United States
Athletes (track and field) at the 1984 Summer Olympics
Athletes (track and field) at the 1987 Pan American Games
Doping cases in athletics
American sportspeople in doping cases
Long Beach State Beach men's track and field athletes
Track and field athletes from Maryland
Pan American Games track and field athletes for the United States